Poth and Schmidt Development Houses is a set of six historic double houses in the Powelton Village neighborhood of Philadelphia, Pennsylvania. They were built in 1890, and are three-story brick buildings in the Queen Anne-style. They feature mansard roofs with terra cotta shingles, front porches, and projecting three-story bay windows.  The house at 3314-3316 Arch Street has a corner tower.

It was added to the National Register of Historic Places in 1983.

Gallery

References

Residential buildings on the National Register of Historic Places in Philadelphia
Queen Anne architecture in Pennsylvania
Residential buildings completed in 1890
Powelton Village, Philadelphia